The League of Gentlemen is a 1960 British heist action comedy film directed by Basil Dearden and starring Jack Hawkins, Nigel Patrick, Roger Livesey and Richard Attenborough. It is based on the 1958 novel The League of Gentlemen by John Boland and adapted by Bryan Forbes, who also starred in the film.

Plot
A manhole opens at night in an empty street and out climbs Lieutenant-Colonel Norman Hyde (Jack Hawkins) in a dinner suit. He gets into a Rolls-Royce and drives home. There, he prepares seven envelopes, each containing an American crime paperback called The Golden Fleece, halves of ten £5-notes and an unsigned invitation from “Co-operative Removals Limited” to lunch at the Cafe Royal.

The envelopes are sent to former army officers, each in desperate or humiliating circumstances. When they all turn up looking for the other halves of the £5-notes which are handed out, Hyde asks their opinion of the novel which is about a robbery. They show little enthusiasm but Hyde then reveals each person's misdemeanours.

Hyde has no criminal record but holds a grudge for being made redundant by the army after a long career. He intends to rob a bank using the team's skills, with equal shares of £100,000 or more for each man.

The gang meet under the guise of an amateur dramatic society rehearsing Journey’s End to discuss the plan before moving into Hyde’s house and living a military regimen of duties and fines for being out of line. Hyde knows that a million pounds in used notes is regularly delivered to a City of London bank and has details of the delivery.

They raid an army training camp in Dorset for arms and supplies. Hyde, Mycroft, Porthill and Race distract soldiers by posing as senior officers on an unscheduled food inspection. The others steal weapons while posing as telephone repairmen, speaking in Irish accents to divert suspicion to the IRA. Hyde has explained the reasoning behind this ruse by stating the one nationality to whom the British will never give the benefit of the doubt is the Irish.

The gang rent a warehouse to prepare. Race steals vehicles including cars and a lorry which are fitted with false number plates. They are disturbed by a passing policeman who offers to keep an eye on their premises as he patrols. In Hyde’s basement, the gang trains with maps and models. On the eve of the operation, Hyde destroys the plans and recalls his former military glory.

The robbery is bloodless and precise. Using smoke bombs, Sterling submachine guns, and radio jamming equipment, the gang raids the bank, near St Paul’s. The money is seized without serious injury and the robbers escape. At Hyde’s house, celebrations are interrupted by the unexpected arrival of Hyde’s old friend, Brigadier “Bunny” Warren (Robert Coote), who drunkenly recalls the old days. One by one the members leave carrying suitcases filled with notes. Then the telephone rings; Hyde is told that police and soldiers surround the house.

Leading the police is Superintendent Wheatlock (Ronald Leigh-Hunt) from whom Hyde learns the flaw in his plan. A small boy outside the bank had been collecting car registration (licence plate) numbers, a common hobby at the time. The police, discovering the number, found it had been noted by the policeman who visited the warehouse. The policeman had also noted the number of Hyde's own car. Thus a link was established between the robbery and Hyde.

Hyde is escorted to a police van in which the rest are "all present and correct", each having been captured as he left the house.

Cast

 Jack Hawkins as Lieutenant-Colonel Norman Hyde
 Nigel Patrick as Major Peter Race
 Roger Livesey as Captain "Padre" Mycroft
 Richard Attenborough as Lieutenant Edward Lexy
 Bryan Forbes as Captain Martin Porthill
 Kieron Moore as Captain Stevens
 Terence Alexander as Major Rupert Rutland-Smith
 Norman Bird as Captain Frank Weaver
 Robert Coote as Brigadier "Bunny" Warren
 Melissa Stribling as Peggy
 Nanette Newman as Elizabeth Rutland-Smith
 Lydia Sherwood as Hilda
 Doris Hare as Molly Weaver
 David Lodge as C.S.M.
 Patrick Wymark as Wylie
 Gerald Harper as Captain Saunders
 Brian Murray as Private "Chunky" Grogan
 Terence Edmond as Young PC (uncredited)
 Nigel Green as Kissing Man (uncredited)
 Patrick Jordan as Sergeant (uncredited)
 Dinsdale Landen as Young man in gym (uncredited)
 Ronald Leigh-Hunt as Police Superintendent (uncredited)
 Oliver Reed as Chorus Boy (uncredited)
 Norman Rossington as Staff Sergeant Hall (uncredited)
 Bruce Seton as AA Patrolman (uncredited)
 Michael Corcoran as Blackmailer (uncredited)

Production
Allied Film Makers was a short-lived production company founded by Dearden, actors Hawkins, Forbes and Attenborough, and producer Michael Relph. Forbes contributed many of the company's scripts. Dearden had previously directed The Blue Lamp.

The portrait of Hyde's wife (he comments "I regret to say the bitch is still going strong") is a close copy of a portrait of Deborah Kerr which was used in The Life and Death of Colonel Blimp in which Roger Livesey (The League'''s "Padre" Mycroft) also starred.

Forbes points out in his commentary on the DVD that in most films of the time Hyde's wife would be described as dead and not dismissed in such a manner. A scene in the script following the dinner party has Hyde, followed by Race, visiting a teenage girl at school—her photo is also on his desk. It is implied that she is his daughter. A scene which did not make the film has Weaver the teetotaler reaching for the brandy after Hyde has left the dinner. Lexy reminds him he shouldn't but Weaver drinks anyway.

In the original script, Race addressed others as "old dear".

Cary Grant was offered the part of Hyde but turned it down.

Queens Gate Place Mews, SW7, was used as the filming location for Edward Lexy's (Richard Attenborough's) garage.

The magazines in Mycroft’s suitcase at the beginning of the film were borrowed from the set of Peeping Tom that was being filmed at the same time at Pinewood.

Actor Oliver Reed had his first talk on role as a camp chorus boy ref https://en.wikipedia.org/wiki/Oliver_Reed_filmography

Reception
Box office
The film was successful, being the sixth most popular movie at the UK box office in 1960.  By 1971, it had earned a profit of £250,000 Over 20 years later, Bryan Forbes estimated the profit as between £300,000 and £400,000.

Critical
"Neatly written and expertly played," wrote The New York Times in its 1961 review, "a devilishly inventive and amusing screen play by Mr. Forbes...directed crisply and spinningly by Basil Dearden"; while more recently The Daily Telegraph called it "a masterpiece of British cinema"; Dennis Schwartz noted "a fine example of old-fashioned English humor: droll and civil"; and Time Out, "A terrific caper movie...with typically excellent character playing from a lovable set of old lags."The League of Gentlemen was mentioned in the film The Wrong Arm of the Law (1963) as one of the films that “Pearly Gates” (Peter Sellers) was going to show his gang of crooks as a part of his training programme.

Home media
The film was included, along with three other Dearden films, as part of the box set Basil Dearden’s London Underground by the Criterion Collection.

In 2006, a restored version of the film was released as a special edition DVD in the UK. The extras include a South Bank Show documentary on Attenborough and a PDF version of Forbes' original script. An audio commentary for the film was provided by Forbes and his wife Nanette Newman who features in the film as Major Rutland-Smith's wife.

Cultural legacy
The book and film inspired both Alan Moore's comic series The League of Extraordinary Gentlemen and its spin-off film as well as the British comedy troupe The League of Gentlemen''.

References

External links

1960 films
1960s crime comedy films
1960s heist films
British crime comedy films
British heist films
1960s English-language films
Films about bank robbery
Films about veterans
Films based on British novels
Films directed by Basil Dearden
Films set in London
Films shot at Pinewood Studios
1960 comedy films
British Lion Films films
1960s British films
Cultural depictions of Metropolitan Police officers